The Frauen DFB-Pokal 1986–87 was the 7th season of the cup competition, Germany's second-most important title in women's football. In the final which was held in Berlin on 20 June 1987 TSV Siegen defeated STV Lövenich 5–2, thus winning their second cup in a row. It was their second cup title overall, too.

Participants

First round

Replay

Quarter-finals

Semi-finals

Final

See also 

 1986–87 DFB-Pokal men's competition

References 

Fra
DFB-Pokal Frauen seasons